Day of the Nightmare is a 1965 American horror film directed by John A. Bushelman and starring John Ireland, John Hart, and Elena Verdugo. The film is also known as Don't Scream, Doris Mays!. The film was re-released in 1969, 1993 on VHS, and 2003 on DVD. The film tagline is "The Horror of Half Man, Half Woman, ALL KILLER!".

Plot
A man with a multiple personality disorder is accused in murdering of a woman. His wife risks her life trying to find out the truth about her husband's role. She considers that he could have committed the crime but intends to prove it after the police failed to find the victim's corpse. She visits her husband's father, a psychiatrist, only to encounter there a "corpse" who is quite alive and intent on killing both. She magages to survive, but her father-in-law is not so lucky. However, before he dies, he is able to recognize the killer as somebody whom he knows very well.

Cast       
John Ireland as Detective Sgt. Dave Harmon
Beverly Bain as Barbara Crane
Cliff Fields as Jonathan Crane
John Hart as Dr. Philip Crane
Elena Verdugo as Miss Devi
Jimmy Cross as Detective Smith (as James Cross)
Michael Kray as Lieutenant Cody
Maralou Gray as Alice
Bonnie Beckos as Schoolteacher
Bette Treadville as Maid
Liz Renay as Laura Sisterman

References

External links 
 
 
 

1965 films
American horror films
1960s English-language films
Films directed by John A. Bushelman
1960s American films